Bride Live! Volume I is a limited edition live album by Bride. This item is rare, as only 2,500 were produced.

Track listing
 "Intro." – 0:34
 "I Aint Coming Down" – 2:35
 "If I told You It Was The End Of The World" – 4:20
 "The Worm" – 4:47
 "I Found God" – 4:48
 "Under The Blood" – 4:48
 "Day By Day" – 4:13
 "If I Live For You" – 3:32
 "Why Won't He Break" – 4:10
 "End" – 4:56
 "No Drugs" – 0:25
 "It's Only When I'm Left Alone" – 4:08
 "He Never Changes" – 0:07
 "I Love You" – 3:05
 "Amazing Grace" – 3:57
 "The Big Black Motor" – 0:42
 "Jesus On The Mainline" – 3:02
 "I Have Decided" – 3:16
 "Dale's Sermon" – 9:05

Tracks 1-9 recorded at The Christmas Rock Night Festival in Germany, December 1998.
Tracks 10-14 recorded on the Fall 1998 Brazil Tour.
Tracks 15-18 recorded at The King's Palace, Columbus, OH, 11-21-98.
Track 19 recorded at Cornerstone 1997

Personnel
Album artwork - Ron Campbell
Digital Imaging - Steve Schell
Concert Photography - Steve Hutson

References

External links
Old School Records

Bride (band) albums
1999 live albums